Tag-e Oshtoran (also Romanized as Tag-e Oshtorān and Tak Oshtorān; also known as Ṫāgeshṫerow and Ṫagoshṫorū) is a village in Baqeran Rural District, in the Central District of Birjand County, South Khorasan Province, Iran. At the 2006 census, its population was 23, in 7 families. In 2017 a shooting left 2 dead and one injured, now a tiny population of 14 remains

See also 
 Greater Khorasan
 Khorasan Province

References 

Populated places in Birjand County